Kanykei Boobekovna Kubanychbekova (born 30 September 1999) is a Kyrgyzstani sports shooter. She competed in the women's 10 metre air rifle event at the 2020 Summer Olympics.

References

External links
 

1999 births
Living people
Kyrgyzstani female sport shooters
Olympic shooters of Kyrgyzstan
Shooters at the 2020 Summer Olympics
Place of birth missing (living people)
21st-century Kyrgyzstani women